Monnina is a genus of flowering plants in the family Polygalaceae. There are 150 to 200 species distributed throughout the Americas from the United States to Patagonia. It was named after José Moñino, 1st Count of Floridablanca.

Species include:
 Monnina chimborazeana Chodat
 Monnina equatoriensis Chodat
 Monnina fosbergii Ferreyra
 Monnina haughtii Ferreyra
 Monnina loxensis Benth.
 Monnina obovata Chodat & Sodiro
 Monnina pseudoaestuans Ferreyra & Wurdack
 Monnina sodiroana Chodat

References

 
Fabales genera
Taxonomy articles created by Polbot